Suleiman Othman Hunkuyi (born 17 July 1959) is a Nigerian politician who became the senator of Kaduna North Senatorial District at the Federal Republic of Nigeria's Senate in 2015 Nigerian general elections.

Hunkuyi was elected the chairman Kudan local government area of Kaduna state, he then contested and won the Kaduna North Senatorial District election on 28 March 2015.
Senator Hunkuyi, declared that the Governor of Kaduna state Malam Nasir Ahmad el-Rufai has not been fair to the people of the  State, and
vowed to "do everything possible" to vote him
out in the next election in 2019

Early life and education
Senator Hunkuyi had attended the Kafanchan Teachers College later proceeded to Ahmadu Bello University and graduated with a bachelor's degree of Education (B.ed) in 1986.

2023 elections 
Hunkuyi emerged as the gubernatorial aspirant of New Nigeria People’s Party (NNPP). In 2022, he dumped People Democratic Party (PDP) for NNPP.

References

1959 births
Living people
Nigerian Muslims
Politicians from Kaduna State
Peoples Democratic Party (Nigeria) politicians
Ahmadu Bello University alumni